Jordanita budensis is a moth of the family Zygaenidae. It is found in disjunct populations in central Spain, southern France, Italy, eastern Austria, Hungary, the Balkan Peninsula, Greece, Ukraine, the Crimea, the European part of southern Russia, the Caucasus, Transcaucasia, Turkey, southern Siberia, Mongolia and the Amur region.

The length of the forewings is 12.5–15.5 mm for males and 8–11 mm for females. Adults are on wing during the day.

The larvae feed on Centaurea paniculata in western Europe, Centaurea triumfetti in central Europe and Achillea setacea on the Crimea. They mine the leaves of their host plant. The mine has the form of a fleck mine. The opening is a slit at the very side of the mine. They have a black head and a yellowish-brown body with red-violet lines. Pupation takes place in a thin cocoon under the soil surface.

References

C. M. Naumann, W. G. Tremewan: The Western Palaearctic Zygaenidae. Apollo Books, Stenstrup 1999,

External links
Lepiforum e. V.

Procridinae
Moths described in 1858
Moths of Asia
Moths of Europe